Toma is an American crime drama television series that ran on ABC from March 21, 1973 to May 10, 1974. The series stars Tony Musante as a real-life detective Dave Toma, who was a master of disguise and undercover work. Susan Strasberg and Simon Oakland also star in supporting roles as his wife and his boss, respectively.

Overview
The series stars Tony Musante and Susan Strasberg and was based on the real-life story and published biography of Newark, New Jersey, police detective David Toma. Toma had compiled an amazing arrest record during his years on the force, particularly in arresting drug dealers. His boss, Inspector Spooner, was played by Simon Oakland. The actual David Toma played bit parts in the series.

The show ended production after one season, as Musante had only agreed to film one full season, citing a desire not to get trapped into only playing one character over a long period of time. The network and producers had initially assumed this to be a negotiating ploy, but it was not. Musante held firm and did not return for a second season.

Although the role of David Toma was recast with Robert Blake, it was soon felt that Blake would be better served with a different concept;  accordingly, Toma was overhauled and became the 1975 series Baretta.  Apart from the circumstances of its conception, Baretta has no obvious on-screen connection to Toma, as the shows have no characters or settings in common.

Many of the people on the Toma writing staff would go on to write episodes of The Rockford Files, which debuted shortly after Toma'''s cancellation.  These writers included Stephen J. Cannell, Roy Huggins (who signed most of his work on both shows as "John Thomas James"), Juanita Bartlett, Zekial Marko, Don Carlos Dunaway, and Gloryette Clark.  Series stars Musante, Strasberg and Oakland would also guest star on various episodes of The Rockford Files.  An early version of the character of Jim Rockford had originally been conceived of as a guest star for a never-filmed episode of Toma; the script was rewritten and became The Rockford Files 90-minute pilot, and all connections and references to Toma were dropped.

Episodes

Pilot (1973)

Season 1 (1973–74)

Reviews
The series received favorable reviews and blistering criticism for its depictions of criminal and police violence. Although Toma was achieving relatively good ratings, the show ended after one season. A second season was planned, but Tony Musante refused to continue with the show. Musante had told the producers at the outset that he wanted to do only one season, but they mistakenly assumed that this was only a negotiating tactic and that he would return if the series was renewed. The show would rank 45th out of 80 shows that season, with a 17.7 rating.

Legacy

Baretta

Rather than recast the starring role of Toma, the show was retooled as Baretta starring Robert Blake, with violent scenes toned down. Baretta debuted as a mid-season replacement on ABC in early 1975.

The Rockford Files

According to interviews on The Greatest American Hero DVD set, a writers' strike during the shooting of Toma is what indirectly led to The Rockford Files. Writer Stephen J. Cannell and his mentor Roy Huggins created the character of Jim Rockford as a way to get around an impossible schedule created by the strike.

Reruns
Despite having contributed to the development of the popular Baretta, reruns of Toma were never syndicated to local stations, and repeats of the show on national television post-cancellation have been rare. Repeats of Toma aired in the late-1970s during ABC Late Night, and later on USA Network's Crimebusters'' in 1984–1985. One episode aired on TV Land in 2001.

References

External links

Roy Huggins' American Archive of Television Interview

Toma at Television Obscurities

1973 American television series debuts
1974 American television series endings
American Broadcasting Company original programming
1970s American crime drama television series
Television series by Universal Television
Television series based on actual events
English-language television shows
Television shows set in Los Angeles
Television shows set in New Jersey
Newark, New Jersey in fiction
American detective television series